Vitreolina alayoi is a species of sea snail, a marine gastropod mollusk in the family Eulimidae.

Distribution and habitat
This species occurs in the Caribbean Sea and off Cuba.

References

alayoi
Gastropods described in 2001